Harry Radford was never really the first manager of Nottingham Forest, but he was the first to make an impact in running the club. His official title was Secretary.
Before he was around the club just let things drift, but he got them into shape and eventually Forest were elected into the Football League in 1892. Though he never had the title of manager, he did everything a normal manager would.

Honours

Football Alliance
 Champions (1): 1891–92

References

Nottingham Forest F.C. managers
Year of birth missing
Year of death missing